Sledd Hall is an historic student residence building in Murphree Area on the northern edge of the University of Florida campus in Gainesville, Florida.  Built in 1929, the dormitory was designed by architect Rudolph Weaver in the Collegiate Gothic style.  It is a contributing property in the University of Florida Campus Historic District.

Sledd Hall was dedicated to the university's first president, Andrew Sledd, who served from 1905 to 1909.  For the first ten years of its existence, the building was known as "New Dormitory," and it was renamed following Sledd's death in 1939.

Sledd Hall is one of several University of Florida buildings that appear in the Sean Connery film Just Cause as a stand-in for the campus of Harvard University.

See also 

 History of the University of Florida
 List of University of Florida buildings
 List of University of Florida presidents
 University of Florida Campus Historic District
 University of Florida student housing

References

External links 
 Virtual tour of University of Florida Campus Historic District at Alachua County's Department of Growth Management
 The University of Florida Historic Campus at UF Facilities Planning & Construction
 George A. Smathers Libraries
 UF Builds: The Architecture of the University of Florida
 Sledd Hall

Buildings at the University of Florida
Rudolph Weaver buildings
Historic district contributing properties in Florida
National Register of Historic Places in Gainesville, Florida
School buildings completed in 1929
1929 establishments in Florida